Short-term rental, often abbreviated to STR, describes furnished self-contained apartments or houses that are rented for short periods of time.  They are usually seen as an alternative to hotels. "Short stay" rentals are an offshoot of the corporate housing market, and are also offered by private owners and investors via online platforms such as Airbnb. Popular uses include vacation rental and relocation.

This industry is seen as the most affordable option for month-long stays. They might be 25–50% cheaper than a hotel room, and the apartments typically offer additional amenities such as kitchen/kitchenettes, washer and dryer. Some companies permit pets. Booking procedures may include credit checks, damage and holding deposits, and departure cleaning fees. Rentals from online platforms such as Airbnb are a common form of access to these rentals. Contact with the landlord or agent is recommended, as online photographs and descriptions can be misleading. 

The proliferation of short-term rentals can affect those in the area who are looking for long-term rentals. Through short-term rental, landlords can make upwards of 20% more than they would on a rent controlled property. Thus landlords convert their properties into short-term rental units, and there are fewer long-term housing options available to permanent residents. Landlords also sometimes pressure and coerce people out of their homes, particularly if residents are of low-income.  In Australia, short-term rentals have contributed to the rental crisis occurring in 2022, although STRs diminished during the 2019-2022 COVID-19 pandemic. 

Neighborhood community groups have voiced concern that these temporary residents do not have a stake in the community and therefore are less likely to be conscientious about how their behavior effects those around them. 

Short-term rental properties place the responsibility of following zoning and municipal requirements onto residents using short-term rental services like Airbnb. This leads to illegal short-term rentals that violate many of these codes. Fire codes, safety codes, workers' benefits, and transient occupancy taxes are often avoided by illegal short-term rentals.

Short-term rentals can pose a policy challenge to local lawmakers, who have to find a way to mitigate the problems that they cause for permanent residents. For example, in Santa Cruz, California, local supervisors have discussed parking restrictions in the areas where there are many short-term rentals, in order to discourage people from staying there, and prioritize the local residents' ability to park. Some governments have taken measures to combat the rise in short-term rentals—for example, as of 2019, London short-term rentals were restricted to 90 days.

See also
Vacation property
Apartment hotel

References

Apartment types
Renting